Zoubia is a village in south-western Algeria.

References

Neighbouring towns and cities

Populated places in Béchar Province